The Küssaburg, Küssenberg or Küssaberg Castle is a ruined hilltop castle located at an elevation of  in Bechtersbohl, a village in the municipality of Küssaberg, in the county of Waldshut in the German state of Baden-Württemberg.

The name may be derived from the Roman personal name, Cossinius, or from the German Kissen (Alemannic Chüssi) which means "cushion", after the shape of the mountain on which it stands.

The hill castle is one of the most important historic buildings on the High Rhine and a landmark of the county of Waldshut. It was probably constructed between 1125 and 1141. The present ruins were owned inter alia by the counts of Küssenberg, the Bishopric of Constance and the counts of Sulz. The castle, which was later developed into a fortress, was destroyed by a fire started by its garrison on 8 March 1634 when the Swedish Army approached it during the Thirty Years' War and by a landslide on 25  December 1664. In the  19th century work began on uncovering the ruins which have since become a popular destination in the region.

Location 
The ruins lie above the village at an elevation of about 634 metres above sea level. They are a landmark in this region and overlook the Klettgau, which runs east of the mountain, and the Rhine valley (High Rhine). In addition, there are views of the Southern Black Forest and the Aargau in Switzerland.

Literature 
 Andreas Weiß, Christian Ruch: Die Küssaburg. Herausgegeben vom Küssaburg-Bund e.V., o. O. 2009.
 Robert Feger: Burgen und Schlösser in Südbaden. Eine Auswahl. Weidlich, Würzburg, 1984, .
 Norbert Nothhelfer (ed.): Der Kreis Waldshut. Konrad Theiss Verlag, Stuttgart/Aalen, 1975, .
 Küssaberg im Landkreis Waldshut. Gemeinde Küssaberg.
 Lauchringen, 1985.
 Arthur Hauptmann: Burgen einst und jetzt - Burgen und Burgruinen in Südbaden und angrenzenden Gebieten. Verlag Südkurier, Konstanz, 1984, pp. 259–263.
 Heinz Voellner: Die Burgen und Schlösser zwischen Wutachschlucht und Hochrhein, 1979.
 Bender, Knappe, Wilke: Burgen im südlichen Baden. 1979, .
 Franz Xaver Kraus: Die Kunstdenkmäler des Großherzogthums Baden, Freiburg im Breisgau, 1892, Vol. III - Kreis Waldshut; pp. 133-142 online
 Christian Roder: Die Schloßkaplanei Küssenberg und die St. Annenkapelle zu Dangstetten. In: Freiburger Diözesan Archiv
 Emil Müller-Ettikon, Kurzer Überblick über die Geschichte Küssabergs, Gemeinde Küssaberg (publ.), 1986.

References

External links 

 Official Internet site
 Küssaburg Guide at Küssaburg.com
 Artist's impression by Wolfgang Braun
 

Ruined castles in Germany